"Good Luck" is a song by British electronic music duo Basement Jaxx featuring vocals from Lisa Kekaula of American band the Bellrays. It was released on 5 January 2004 as the second single from their third studio album, Kish Kash, and reached number 12 on the UK Singles Chart, number two on the US Hot Dance Club Play, and number 22 on the Australian ARIA Singles Chart. The song was nominated in the Best Dance Recording category at the 47th Grammy Awards.

Development
"We had to kick it off with something. Whatever we chose people would say, 'That isn't house music.' Who cares?" (Complaints about the lack of house music have appeared on the band's website.) It's a brave track, even more so for including a 16-piece orchestra. But it didn't come easily. "Initially, Lisa sounded like a diva and we didn't want that. With two hours before she had to go back to America, Simon strummed an AC/DC riff and I scribbled down some words and suddenly we had something that didn't sound like a Basement Jaxx record - a rock 'n' roll song which didn't even sound modern."

Buxton said the song was the most difficult track to work on of the album. "That took us ages and we went through loads of processes. It took a long time to get it to its finish point," stated Buxton.

Critical reception
While predicting winners from all of the 47th Annual Grammy Awards' categories, Sal Cinquemani and Eric Henderson from Slant Magazine predicted the song's win, with Henderson called the song "a fantastic, chugging single that shoves Britney's sex-pixie ditty and the Scissor Sisters's queer-as-milquetoast shtick face down in the dirt."

Music video
A music video was produced to promote the single, filmed in Buenos Aires, Argentina.

Track listings

UK CD single (first release)
 "Good Luck"
 "Mere Pass"

UK 12-inch single (first release)
A1. "Good Luck" (Tim Deluxe Funked club mix)
B1. "Mere Pass"
B2. "Good Luck" (Tim Deluxe Funked dub)

UK 12-inch single (Roni Size mixes)
A. "Good Luck" (Roni Size vocal mix)
B. "Good Luck" (Roni Size dancefloor mix)

UK CD single (re-release)
 "Good Luck"
 "Cish Cash" (featuring Siouxsie Sioux)

UK 12-inch single (re-release)
A1. "Good Luck"
A2. "Ah-Choo"
B1. "Onyx"

UK 12-inch single (remixes)
A1. "Good Luck" (summer bootleg version)
B1. "Cish Cash" (Vitalic remix)
B2. "Right Here's the Spot" (Switch's Drunk at the Dogstar mix)

Australian and New Zealand CD single
 "Good Luck" (album version) – 4:27
 "Mere Pass" – 4:49
 "Good Luck" (Tim Deluxe Funked club mix) – 7:15
 "Good Luck" (Tim Deluxe Funked dub) – 6:54
 "Good Luck" (Roni Size vocal mix) – 4:24
 "Good Luck" (Roni Size dancefloor mix) – 6:07

Charts

Weekly charts

Year-end charts

Certifications

Release history

In popular culture

"Good Luck" featured as the opening theme song to the 2004 CGI anime movie Appleseed and was also featured in the Victoria's Secret fashion show for 2003 and 2005.

A version without lyrics was used during the opening sequence of the BBC's UEFA Euro 2004 television coverage. This spawned a re-release of the original single, and it entered at number 14 on the UK Singles Chart on 4 July 2004. The same instrumental version was later used by BBC Radio Sheffield as the opening theme for their live local football coverage, where it is still in use as of December 2017.

The song appeared on American reality television series Queer Eye for the Straight Guy.

References

Basement Jaxx songs
2003 songs
2004 singles
Astralwerks singles
Songs written by Felix Buxton
Songs written by Simon Ratcliffe (musician)
UK Independent Singles Chart number-one singles
XL Recordings singles